Peritornenta is a moth genus of the family Depressariidae.

Species
 Peritornenta bacchata (Meyrick, 1914)
 Peritornenta circulatella (Walker, 1864)
 Peritornenta gennaea (Meyrick, 1923)
 Peritornenta lissopis (Turner, 1947)
 Peritornenta minans (Meyrick, 1921)
 Peritornenta rhodophanes (Meyrick, 1902)
 Peritornenta spilanthes (Meyrick, 1933)
 Peritornenta stigmatias Turner, 1900
 Peritornenta thyellia (Meyrick, 1902)

References

 
Depressariinae
Moth genera